is a Japanese pop rock band from Nara Prefecture which is affiliated with Sacra Music. The band began activities under the name Snowman in 2013, and would perform at various music venues throughout Japan and release several independent singles and albums. They changed to their current name in 2018, and later that year made their major debut under Sacra Music with the release of the single "Start Dash", the title song of which was used as the second ending theme to the anime television series Gundam Build Divers.

History
The band began activities in 2013 under the name . Originally consisting of childhood friends Yūji Teraniji and Masuda, they were later joined by vocalist Mikiha, who had first heard of Snowman after they announced that they were looking for a female vocalist. At the time, she had been studying at Osaka University. In March 2015, the band released their first single "Good For Nothing", followed by their first mini-album Snow Wonderland, which was sold as a limited edition in Tower Records stores. They also began participating in several competitions throughout the country.

Between 2016 and 2018, the band released several more CDs, including the split CD "Refrain" and the album , the latter of which was released in two volumes. During a live concert titled "Yuki Fes" in January 2018, the band announced that they would be changing their name to Spira Spica; the name was derived from the Latin phrase meaning "having hopes as long as one lives" and the star Spica. This was followed by the album , their first wide release, as well as the announcement that they would be making their major debut under the Sacra Music label. On August 8, 2018, they released their first major single ; the title song was used as the second ending theme for the anime television series Gundam Build Divers.

Spira Spica released their second single  on March 6, 2019. Their next single, was released on May 29, 2019; the title song is used as the ending theme for the anime series Ao-chan Can't Study!. Their fourth single, was released on August 28, 2019; the title song is used as the opening theme for the anime series Do You Love Your Mom and Her Two-Hit Multi-Target Attacks?. Their fifth single, an extended play titled "Re:RISE", was released on October 23, 2019; the title song is used as the opening theme for the original net animation Gundam Build Divers Re:Rise. Their sixth single, was released on February 2, 2022; the title song is used as the opening theme for the anime series My Dress-Up Darling. They released the album  on March 16, 2022.

Members
  – Vocals
  – Guitar
  – Bass

Discography

Singles

References

External links
Official website 

Anime musical groups
Japanese pop rock music groups
Sacra Music artists
Musical groups established in 2013
2013 establishments in Japan